The India women's national cricket team toured Ireland and England between July and September 2006. They played Ireland in 2 One Day Internationals, winning the series 2–0. They then played England in 1 Twenty20 International, 2 Test matches and 5 ODIs. England won the ODI series 4–0, whilst India won the Test series and T20I series, both 1–0.

England's Sarah Taylor set the record for the fastest cricketer, male of female, to earn their first cap in all three formats of international cricket, doing so in the space of nine days.

Tour of Ireland

Squads

WODI Series

1st ODI

2nd ODI

Tour of England

Squads

Tour matches

50-over match: England A v India

20-over match: Marylebone Cricket Club v India

20-over match: Marylebone Cricket Club v India

Only T20I

Test Series

1st Test

2nd Test

WODI Series

1st ODI

2nd ODI

3rd ODI

4th ODI

5th ODI

References

External links
India Women tour of Ireland and England 2006 from Cricinfo

International cricket competitions in 2006
2006 in women's cricket
Women's cricket tours of England
India women's national cricket team tours